Crescent Hockey Club is a feld hockey club based in Sialkot, Pakistan. It which hosted several Pakistani Olympians. It has played in the Surjit Silver Jubilee Hockey Tournament at Jalandhar, India in 2008.

Current players
 Farhan Asif
 Amair Saleem
 Ateeq
 M. Tofeeq Shabir
 Akhtar Ali
 Imran Butt
 Waheed Islam
 Abu Bakar 
 Mohammad Atif
 Adeel Akram

References

1960 establishments in Pakistan
Field hockey clubs established in 1960
Pakistani field hockey clubs